Contremoulins is a commune in the Seine-Maritime department in the Normandy region in northern France.

Geography

Population

Places of interest
 The eighteenth century ruined château of Franqueville.
 The château de Gruville.
 The church of St.Martin, dating from the seventeenth century.

See also
Communes of the Seine-Maritime department

References

Communes of Seine-Maritime